is a former Japanese footballer who last played as a right-back for V-Varen Nagasaki.

Career
Murakami joined Kashiwa Reysol as an apprentice professional in 2007. He turned full-time professional with Reysol at the start of the 2008 season. He made his professional debut on 4 October 2008 in a 4-0 win over Omiya Ardija, scoring a first-half hat-trick.

Murakami transferred to Albirex Niigata on 23 December 2010, for an undisclosed fee. He made his club debut on 23 July 2011 against Kawasaki Frontale. He moved to Ehime FC on 1 February 2014 on a free transfer.

Club statistics
Updated to 2 February 2018.

References

External links
Profile at V-Varen Nagasaki
Profile at Albirex Niigata  

 

1984 births
Living people
Juntendo University alumni
Association football people from Tokyo
Japanese footballers
J1 League players
J2 League players
Kashiwa Reysol players
Albirex Niigata players
Ehime FC players
V-Varen Nagasaki players
Association football defenders